MSG Wannabe is a seasonal South Korean supergroup formed on the MBC variety show Hangout with Yoo. The group consists of members Byeollu Ji, Kim Jung-su, Kang Chang-mo, Jung Ki-suck, Lee Dong-hwi, Lee Sang-yi, Wonstein and Parc Jae-jung.

Members

JSDK
 Kim Jung-min (Kim Jung-su)
 Simon Dominic (Jung Ki-suck)
 Lee Dong-hwi
 Lee Sang-yi

M.O.M
 Jee Seok-jin (Byeollu Ji)
 KCM (Kang Chang-mo)
 Wonstein
 Parc Jae-jung

Discography

Albums

Singles

Videography

Music videos

Awards and nominations

See also
 Hangout with Yoo
 WSG Wannabe

Notes

References

External links
 Official website 
 Official YouTube Channel 

2021 establishments in South Korea
K-pop music groups
Musical groups established in 2021
Musical groups from Seoul
South Korean contemporary R&B musical groups
Supergroups (music)